Toke (also known as Valtoke) was said to be Earl of Vendsyssel and even King or Earl of Scania. He has a rune stone in Aars near Aars church which is called the Aars stone which reads: (Front) Asser placed this stone in memory of Valtóki, his lord. (Rear) The stone proclaims that it will stand here forever, and it will mark Valtóki's cairn. He was a son of Gorm the Old, but it has been said that he was an illegitimate child. He also had  positions in the Kingdom of Denmark, as well as a son, named Asbjørn Tokesen. Toke died during the Battle of Fýrisvellir, along with his son Asbjørn, who also fought in the battle. Odinkar is also mentioned as a son of a "Toki, duke of Vendsyssel".

References

Vendsyssel
People from the North Jutland Region
10th-century Danish people
Viking rulers
986 deaths
House of Knýtlinga
10th-century rulers in Europe
10th-century Vikings
Sons of kings